"In de Ghetto" is a song by American DJ David Morales. He released it in 1994 with Delta Bennett. In 1996, a new version, "In de Ghetto '96", included participation of the Bad Yard Club and featured Crystal Waters. The song charted on the US Billboard Hot Dance Club Play chart, now known as Dance Club Songs chart, making it to number 20. It also made an appearance in the UK Singles Chart, peaking at number 35, making it Morales' only charting single in the UK.

1996 remix version

Track listing
"In de Ghetto" (Boss mix) – 7:28
"In de Ghetto" (1996 Project 1 Jungle Mix) – 4:49

Critical reception
Larry Flick from Billboard wrote, "This reggae-kissed house anthem has been a dancefloor staple for well over a year now. Now serving as the first single from Mercury's imminent 100% Pure Dance compilation, it has been refreshed with a deliciously feline guest vocal by Waters. She vamps with infectious energy and glee, while Morales upgrades the groove by injecting glossy pop keyboards. Icing on the cake is a killer, instantly chantable hook, which should push it over the top with popsters who enjoy the growing influx of dance music on radio." He also added, "It's cute to hear La Waters tearing her way through one of Morales' better deep-house grooves, though it will feel like only a tease after a while. After all, it has been two years since Storyteller was released."

Charts

Covers, samplings and adaptations
The track has been covered and remixed a number of times

Greg B version
Most notably a version by Greg B released on Sony BMG and included in the compilation Été 2007.

Tribal Nation version
In 1995, Tribal Nation released a cover that charted in France.

Charts

Tribes World
In 2003, Tribes World released a cover that charted in France.

Charts

J Balvin & Skrillex version

The song was heavily sampled in 2021 by the Colombian singer J Balvin and the American record producer Skrillex in an amended title "In da Getto". The song includes added rap lyrics. The song has charted in a great number of countries including number 1 in Colombia, number 2 in both US Billboard Dance/Electronic Songs and US Billboard Latin Airplay charts and number 7 in US Hot Latin Songs chart. It has also charted in France, Italy and Spain amongst others.

References

1994 songs
Crystal Waters songs